Amon Miyamoto (born January 4, 1958, in Tokyo) has directed numerous productions in Japan and worldwide, from musicals, straight plays, opera, and kabuki as well as other art genres.

In 2004, he became the first Japanese director to direct a musical on Broadway for the revival of  Pacific Overtures which received four Tony Award nominations.

He will direct THE KARATE KID The Musical Pre-Broadway World Premiere Beginning May 25, 2022, at STAGES St. Louis,

He made his North American opera-directing debut in 2007 with Tan Dun's TEA: A Mirror of Soul (U.S. premiere) at the Santa Fe Opera.

His recent works in New York include THE TEMPLE OF THE GOLDEN PAVILION at Lincoln Center Festival. His European opera credits include: THE MAGIC FLUTE (Landestheater Linz in Austria), LE PAVILLON D’OR (Opéra national du Rhin in France), PARSIFAL, and MADAME BUTTERFLY (Semperoper Opera House in Germany) which is also planned for San Francisco Opera in 2023, and the Royal Danish Theatre in Copenhagen in 2024.

Miyamoto made his directing debut with his original musical I Got Merman, winning the National Performing Arts Festival Award. He is a recipient of the Matsuyo Akimoto Award of the Asahi Performing Arts Awards. He served as the inaugural artistic director of Kanagawa Arts Theater (KAAT) from 2010 to 2014.

Biography

Career highlights
 1987: Made a debut as a director with the original musical I GOT MERMAN, and received the Agency for Cultural Affairs' National Arts Festival Award the next year
 1998: Made a film directing debut with BEAT which was officially invited to the Venice International Film Festival
 2001: Directed I GOT MERMAN at The Rich Forum Theatre, Stamford, CT, USA
 2004: Directed and choreographed a revival production of Pacific Overtures on Broadway, and became the first Asian director on Broadway
 2004: Directed Into The Woods in Tokyo, Japan, for which he received the Matsuyo Akimoto Award of the Asahi Performing Arts Awards
 2005:  Pacific Overtures was nominated under four categories for the Tony Awards
 2007: Directed the U.S. premiere of TEA: A Mirror of Soul at The Santa Fe Opera, NM, USA
 2008: Directed the world premiere of the original musical Up In The Air at The Kennedy Center, WA, USA
 2010: Inaugurated as the first artistic director of the Kanagawa Arts Theatre (KAAT)
 2010: Directed the West End production of The Fantasticks, London, UK
 2011: Directed The Temple of The Golden Pavilion, a play based on a novel of the same title by Yukio Mishima, adapted by Serge Lamothe, as the inaugural production of the Kanagawa Arts Theatre
 2011: The Temple of The Golden Pavilion was invited to Lincoln Center Festival in NY, USA
 2013: Directed the Canadian premiere of TEA: A Mirror of Soul at the Vancouver Opera, Canada
 2013: Directed Mozart's opera “DIE ZAUBERFLÖTE” (The Magic Flute) at The Landestheater Linz, Austria
 2016: Directed the off-Broadway production of DRUM TAO's DRUM HEART in New York, NY, USA
 2016: Directed the special cultural program The Land of the Rising Sun at the World Form on Sport and Culture, an official kickoff event toward Tokyo 2020 Olympics & Paralympics games and more.
 2016: Directed YUGEN: The Hidden Beauty of Japan, the world's first 3D live theater featuring the Japanese Noh theater in Singapore.
 2017: Directed a reading performance of Fanatic Artist Hokusai, an original play about the later life of Hokusai, at the British Museum's Great Court.
 2018: Directed the opera “The Temple of The Golden Pavilion“, based on the novel by Yukio Mishima, at Opéra national du Rhin in Strasbourg and Mulhouse, France.
 2018: Directed YUGEN: The Hidden Beauty of Japan at the Royal Opera of Versailles. The special one night performance was attended by President Emmanuel Macron of France and Naruhito, Crown Prince of Japan.

Early life and education

Miyamoto was born to parents who ran a café named “Sugawa” (now “Sabou Erika”) across from the Shinbashi Enbujō, one of the most prominent kabuki theaters in Tokyo. As a child, he paid frequent visits to the Shimbashi Enbujō as well as movie theaters, Kabuki-za, and other theaters under the influence of his mother who was a former dancer of the Shochiku Revue Company. In kindergarten, he began to study (Nihon Buyō) at Fujima School of Japanese Dance where Nakamura Kanzaburō XVIII was one of his peers. Around that time, he became absorbed in Hollywood films and began to learn about musicals. When he was in elementary school, he began practicing Tea ceremony. He was brought up right in the middle of Hanamachi, a Japanese courtesan and geisha district.

While in high school, he was cast as the leading role in the school's theater club production of Godspell in which he made his acting debut. This musical received positive reviews and was featured in the Kinema Shunpo magazine. He proceeded to attend Tamagawa University, where he majored in Theater in the College of Arts. In the middle of his senior year, he was cast as a dancer in the musical Pippin.

Early career
He debuted as a dancer in 1980. He performed in musicals such as Hair, Annie Get Your Gun, and Chicago, and devoted his time to dance and choreography. He visited New York repeatedly, and studied in London for two years beginning in 1985.

He made his directing debut with his original musical I Got Merman in 1987. The following year, he received the Agency for Cultural Affairs' Performing Arts Festival Award.

International career highlights
 Film “BEAT”
 In 1998, Miyamoto made his film-directing debut with BEAT which was officially invited to the 55th Venice International Film Festival's International Film Critics' Week.

 Musical “Pacific Overtures”
 In 2000, Miyamoto directed the musical Pacific Overtures at The New National Theater, Tokyo. During the run of the production, Stephen Sondheim, the composer of the musical, was in Tokyo participating in an award ceremony of the Praemium Imperiale ("World Culture Prize in Memory of His Imperial Highness Prince Takamatsu"), and John Weidman, the lyricist of the musical, was also in Tokyo for a musical produced by Shiki Company. Both of them came to see Miyamoto's production of Pacific Overtures. Sondheim, whom Miyamoto worships, spoke very highly of the production and Miyamoto’s direction during his speech at the ceremony of the Praemium Imperiale, instead of taking about his own achievements. In 2002, Miyamoto’s Pacific Overtures was presented at the Lincoln Center Festival, and then at The Kennedy Center in Washington D.C. In 2004, Miyamoto made his Broadway debut with Pacific Overtures as the first Asian director on Broadway. In 2005, the production was nominated for Tony Awards under four categories.

 Musical “I Got Merman”
 In 2001, Amon was in New York City to direct I Got Merman at the Rich Forum Theater, Stamford Center in Connecticut. The production opened only a few days after the September 11 attacks. On the morning of the terrorist attacks, Miyamoto was at the Grand Central Terminal, heading to the rehearsal. Even though the show did open, Miyamoto felt extreme stressed and left for Bangkok, Thailand two weeks later to escape from the chaos. On his first day in Bangkok, he was severely injured in a car accident but miraculously escaped death.

 Contemporary Opera “TEA: A Mirror of Soul”
 In 2007, upon composer Tan Dun’s recommendation, Miyamoto directed the first opera style production of TEA: A Mirror of Soul, premiered at the Santa Fe Opera in the U.S. The revival production was presented at Opera Company of Philadelphia (conducted by Tan Dun himself) in the U.S. in 2010 and at the Vancouver Opera in Canada in 2013.

 Musical “Up in the Air”
 Up in the Air is a musical based on “Boonah, the Tree-Climbing Frog,” a book by Tsutomu Minakami. Henry Krieger, the composer of Dreamgirls wrote the music, and the production had its world premiere at The Kennedy Center in Washington D.C. in 2008.

 Musical “The Fantasticks”
 He made his West End debut with The Fantasticks in June 2010.

 Play “The Temple of the Golden Pavilion”
 Inaugurated as the Artistic Director of Kanagawa Arts Theatre in April 2010, he directed The Temple of the Golden Pavilion, a play based on the novel by Yukio Mishima, as the venue's inaugural production in January 2011. In July, it was presented at the Lincoln Center Festival as Miyamoto's second production at the festival (following Pacific Overtures). Following the successful run in the U.S., the production was revived in Japan (Tokyo and Osaka) in January 2012.

 Opera “DIE ZAUBERFLÖTE” (The Magic Flute)
 In 2013, he directed Mozart's opera DIE ZAUBERFLÖTE (The Magic Flute) at the Landestheater Linz in Austria.

 Japanese Noh Theatre x 3D Live Theatre “YUGEN The Hidden Beauty of Japan”
 In 2016, he created and directed YUGEN: The Hidden Beauty of Japan, the world's first 3D live theater featuring Japanese Noh theater at the Singapore River Nights Festival.

 Opera “The Temple of The Golden Pavilion”
 In 2018, he directed the opera The Temple of The Golden Pavilion, based on the novel by Yukio Mishima, at Opéra national du Rhin in Strasbourg and Mulhouse, France.

 Japanese Noh Theatre x 3D Live Theatre “YUGEN The Hidden Beauty of Japan”
 In 2018, he directed YUGEN: The Hidden Beauty of Japan at the Royal Opera of Versailles. The special one night performance was attended by President Emmanuel Macron of France and Naruhito, Crown Prince of Japan.

Selected works

Opera / Operetta

Straight Play

Musical

Kabuki

Noh

Non Verbal Performance

Special Event

Reading

Revue

Dance

Film

Straight Play (as a performer)

References

 DIE ZAUBERFLÖTE
Mozarts Zauberflöte als Computerspiel-ORF.at
1192912 Mozarts „Die Zauberflöte“ ins Heute weitergedacht-nachrichten.at
 Tea: A Mirror of Soul
Savouring Tea, the opera, is easy-The Globe and Mail
REVIEWED: VANCOUVER OPERA’S ‘TEA: A MIRROR OF SOUL’-Vancouver Vantage
Opera Enthusiasts Have a New Favourite Instrument: Water-Vancouver Weekly
 Up in the Air
‘Up in the Air’ a lesson in wit, song-The Washington Times
A Soaring Musical Fable for The Kids-The Washington Post

External links
 Amon Miyamto Official Website https://web.archive.org/web/20100529084406/http://www.amon-miyamoto.com/

Living people
Japanese theatre directors
1958 births
People from Tokyo